is a Japanese footballer who plays as a defender for ReinMeer Aomori from 2023, on loan from Zweigen Kanazawa.

Club career
Inaba made his professional debut in a 1–4 Emperor's Cup loss against Albirex Niigata.

On 26 December 2022, Inaba was announced as a new loan transfer of ReinMeer Aomori for the upcoming 2023 season.

Career statistics

Club

References

External links

2002 births
Living people
Association football people from Osaka Prefecture
Japanese footballers
Association football defenders
J2 League players
Cerezo Osaka players
Zweigen Kanazawa players
ReinMeer Aomori players